State Road 235 (NM 235) is a  state highway in the US state of New Mexico. NM 235's western terminus is at NM 206 south of Portales, and the eastern terminus is a continuation as Farm to Market Road 298 (FM 298) at the Texas/ New Mexico border.

Major intersections

See also

References

235
Transportation in Roosevelt County, New Mexico